Abul Kalam Azad (1888–1958) was an Indian scholar.

Abul Kalam Azad may also refer to:

 A. P. J. Abdul Kalam (1931–2015), the 11th President of India
 Abul Kalam Azad (Bangladeshi politician) (born 1939), Bangladeshi politician and former minister of information
 Abul Kalam Azad Chowdhury (born 1946), Bangladeshi academic and 23rd vice-chancellor of the University of Dhaka
 Abul Kalam Azad (lawyer) (1955–2015), Bangladeshi lawyer and politician
 Abul Kalam Azad (doctor) (born 1960), former director general of the Bangladeshi Directorate General of Health Services
 Abul Kalam Azad (photographer) (born 1964), Indian photographer
 Azad Abul Kalam (born 1966), Bangladeshi actor and director
 Abul Kalam Azad (Indian politician) (born 1967), All India United Democratic Front politician and Assam Legislative Assembly member
 Abul Kalam Azad (officer) (1971–2017), Bangladesh Army and Rapid Action Battalion Officer
Abul Kalam Azad (businessman), Bangladeshi businessman and founder of Azad Products.